Paul McGuire may refer to:

 Paul McGuire (author), freelance author, writer and journalist based in Hong Kong
 Paul McGuire (diplomat) (1903–1978), Australian ambassador to Ireland then Italy during the 1950s
 Paul McGuire (radio host) (born 1953), radio talk show host, author, feature film producer and television commentator
 Paul McGuire (television host), host on Canada's CMT network